The Science Museum is a major museum on Exhibition Road in South Kensington, London. It was founded in 1857 and is one of the city's major tourist attractions, attracting 3.3 million visitors annually in 2019.

Like other publicly funded national museums in the United Kingdom, the Science Museum does not charge visitors for admission, although visitors are requested to make a donation if they are able. Temporary exhibitions may incur an admission fee.

It is one of the five museums in the Science Museum Group.

Founding and history

The museum was founded in 1857 under Bennet Woodcroft from the collection of the Royal Society of Arts and surplus items from the Great Exhibition as part of the South Kensington Museum, together with what is now the Victoria and Albert Museum. It included a collection of machinery which became the Museum of Patents in 1858, and the Patent Office Museum in 1863. This collection contained many of the most famous exhibits of what is now the Science Museum.

In 1883, the contents of the Patent Office Museum were transferred to the South Kensington Museum. In 1885, the Science Collections were renamed the Science Museum and in 1893 a separate director was appointed. The Art Collections were renamed the Art Museum, which eventually became the Victoria and Albert Museum.

When Queen Victoria laid the foundation stone for the new building for the Art Museum, she stipulated that the museum be renamed after herself and her late husband. This was initially applied to the whole museum, but when that new building finally opened ten years later, the title was confined to the Art Collections and the Science Collections had to be divorced from it. On 26 June 1909 the Science Museum, as an independent entity, came into existence.

The Science Museum's present quarters, designed by Sir Richard Allison, were opened to the public in stages over the period 1919–28. This building was known as the East Block, construction of which began in 1913 and temporarily halted by World War I. As the name suggests it was intended to be the first building of a much larger project, which was never realized. However, the museum buildings were expanded over the following years; a pioneering Children's Gallery with interactive exhibits opened in 1931, the Centre Block was completed in 1961–3, the infill of the East Block and the construction of the Lower & Upper Wellcome Galleries in 1980, and the construction of the Wellcome Wing in 2000 result in the museum now extending to Queen's Gate.

Centennial volume: Science for the Nation
The leading academic publisher, Palgrave Macmillan, published the official centenary history of the Science Museum on 14 April 2010. The first complete history of the Science Museum since 1957, Science for the Nation: Perspectives on the History of the Science Museum is a series of individual views by Science Museum staff and external academic historians of different aspects of the Science Museum's history.  While it is not a chronological history in the conventional sense, the first five chapters cover the history of the museum from the Brompton Boilers in the 1860s to the opening of the Wellcome Wing in 2000.  The remaining eight chapters cover a variety of themes concerning the museum's development.

Collections

Objects not on display at one of the Science Museum Group's five museums will generally be stored at the National Collections Centre near Swindon.   Library and archive material is also stored at the Library and Archives at the National Collections Centre.

Access to the collections, library and archives is arranged by appointment through the Dana Research Centre and Library located in Queens Gate, South Kensington.

Over 380,000 of the objects in the Science Museum Group's collections are available to view online at the Science Museum Group's Search Our Collection web page.

Galleries
The Science Museum consists of two buildings – the main building and the Wellcome Wing.  Visitors enter the main building from Exhibition Road, while the Wellcome Wing is accessed by walking through the Energy Hall, Exploring Space and then the Making the Modern World galleries (see below) at ground floor level.

Main building – Level 0

The Energy Hall

The Energy Hall is the first area that most visitors see as they enter the building. On the ground floor, the gallery contains a variety of steam engines, including the oldest surviving James Watt beam engine, which together tell the story of the British industrial revolution.

Also on display is a recreation of James Watt's garret workshop from his home, Heathfield Hall, using over 8,300 objects removed from the room, which was sealed after his 1819 death, when the hall was demolished in 1927.

Exploring Space
Exploring Space is a historical gallery, filled with rockets and exhibits that tell the story of human space exploration and the benefits that space exploration has brought us (particularly in the world of telecommunications).

Making the Modern World

Making the Modern World displays some of the museum's most remarkable objects, including Puffing Billy (the oldest surviving steam locomotive), Crick's double helix, and the command module from the Apollo 10 mission, which are displayed along a timeline chronicling man's technological achievements.

A V-2 rocket, designed by German rocket scientist Wernher von Braun, is displayed in this gallery. Doug Millard, space historian and curator of space technology at the museum, states: "We got to the Moon using V-2 technology but this was technology that was developed with massive resources, including some particularly grim ones. The V-2 programme was hugely expensive in terms of lives, with the Nazis using slave labour to manufacture these rockets".

Stephenson's Rocket used to be displayed in this gallery. After a short UK tour, since 2019 Rocket is on permanent display at the Railway Museum in York, in the Art Gallery.

Main Building – Level minus 1

The Secret Life of the Home 
The Secret Life of the Home shows the development of household appliances mostly from the late 19th and early 20th century, although some are earlier.

Main Building – Level 1

Medicine: The Wellcome Galleries 
The Medicine: The Wellcome Galleries is a five-gallery medical exhibition which spans ancient history to modern times with over 3000 exhibits and specially commissioned artworks. Many of the objects on display come from the Wellcome Collection started by Henry Wellcome. One of the commissioned artworks is a large bronze sculpture of Rick Genest titled Self-Conscious Gene by Marc Quinn. The galleries occupy the museum's entire first floor and opened on 16 November 2019.

Main Building – Level 2

The Clockmakers Museum 
The Clockmakers Museum is the world's oldest clock and watch museum which was originally assembled by the Worshipful Company of Clockmakers in London's Guildhall.

Science City 1550 – 1800: The Linbury Gallery 
The Science City 1550 – 1800: The Linbury Gallery shows how London grew to be a global hub for trade, commerce and scientific enquiry

Mathematics: The Winton Gallery 
The Mathematics: The Winton Gallery examines the role that mathematicians have had in building our modern world. In the landing area to access the gallery (stair C) is a working example of Charles Babbage's Difference engine No.2. This was built by the Science Museum and its main part completed in 1991, to celebrate 200 years since Babbage's birth.

Information Age 

The Information Age gallery has exhibits covering the development of communications and computing over the last two centuries. It explores the six networks that have transformed global communications: The Cable, The Telephone Exchange, Broadcast, The Constellation, The Cell and The Web/ It was opened on 24 October 2014 by the Queen, Elizabeth II, who sent her first tweet from here.

Main Building – Level 3

Wonderlab: The Equinor Gallery 
One of the most popular galleries in the museum is the interactive Wonderlab:The Equinor Gallery, formerly called Launch Pad. The gallery is staffed by Explainers who demonstrate how exhibits work, conduct live experiments and perform shows to schools and the visiting public.

Flight
The Flight gallery charts the development of flight in the 20th century. Contained in the gallery are several full sized aeroplanes and helicopters, including Alcock and Brown's transatlantic Vickers Vimy (1919), Spitfire and Hurricane fighters, as well as numerous aero-engines and a cross-section of a Boeing 747. It opened in 1963 and was refurbished in the 1990s.

Wellcome Wing

Tomorrow's World (Level 0) 
The Tomorrow's World gallery hosts topical science stories and free exhibitions including:

 Our Future Planet : Can Carbon Capture help us fight climate change?
 Mission to Mercury : Bepi Columbo
 Driverless : Who's in control? (exhibition ended January 2021)

IMAX: The Ronson Theatre (Entrance from Level 0) 
The IMAX: The Ronson Theatre shows educational films (some in 3-D) and live events.

Who Am I? (Level 1) 
Visitors to the Who Am I? gallery  can explore the science of who they are through intriguing objects, provocative artworks and hands-on exhibits.

Atmosphere Gallery (Level 2) 
The Atmosphere gallery explores the science of climate.

Engineer your Future (Level 3) 
The Engineer your Future gallery explores whether you have the problem solving and team working skills to succeed in a career in engineering.

Temporary and touring exhibitions
The museum has some dedicated spaces for temporary exhibitions (both free and paid-for) and displays, on level −1 (Basement Gallery), level 0 (inside the Exploring Space Gallery and Tomorrow's World), level 1 (Special Exhibition Gallery 1 – currently closed for refurbishment) and level 2 (Special Exhibition Gallery 2 and The Studio). Most of these travel to other Science Museum Group sites, as well as nationally and internationally.

Recent exhibitions have included:

 Cosmonauts: Birth of Space Age (ended 2016).
 Wounded – Conflict, Casualties and Care (2016–2018) – timed to commemorated the centenary of the Battle of the Somme; explored the development of medical treatment for wounded soldiers during the First World War.
 The Sun: Living with our Star (ended 2019).
 The Last Tsar: Blood and Revolution (ended 2019).
 Top Secret: From Cyphers to Cyber Security (ended 2020, closed at the Science and Industry Museum on 31 August 2021).
 Art of Innovation – from Enlightenment to Dark Matter (2019–2020) – explored the interaction between science, the arts and society; included artworks by Boccioni, Constable, Hepworth, Hockney, Lowry and Turner.
 Codebreaker, on the life of Alan Turing.
 Unlocking Lovelock, which explored the archive of James Lovelock.
 The Science Box contemporary science series toured various venues in the UK and Europe in the 1990s and from 1995 The Science of Sport appeared in various incarnations and venues around the World. In 2005 The Science Museum teamed up with Fleming Media to set up The Science of... to develop and tour exhibitions including The Science of Aliens, The Science of Spying and The Science of Survival.
 In 2008, The Science of Survival exhibition opened to the public and allowed visitors to explore what the world might be like in 2050 and how humankind will meet the challenges of climate change and energy shortages.
 In 2014 the museum launched the family science Energy Show, which toured the country.
 The same year it began a new programme of touring exhibitions which opened with Collider: Step inside the world's greatest experiment to much critical acclaim. The exhibition takes visitors behind the scenes at CERN and explores the science and engineering behind the discovery of the Higgs Boson. The exhibition toured until early 2017.
 Media Space exhibitions also go on tour, notably Only in England which displays works by the photographers Tony Ray-Jones and Martin Parr.

Events

'Astronights' for Children
The Science Museum organises "Astronights", "all-night extravaganza with a scientific twist". Up to 380 children aged between 8 and 11, accompanied by adults, are invited to spend an evening performing fun "science based" activities and then spend the night sleeping in the museum galleries amongst the exhibits. In the morning, they're woken to breakfast and more science, watching a show before the end of the event.

'Lates' for Adults
On the evening of the last Wednesday of every month (except December) the museum organises an adults only evening with up to 30 events, from lectures to silent discos. Previous Lates have seen conversations with the actress activist Lily Cole and Biorevolutions with the Francis Crick Institute which attracted around 7000 people, mostly under the age of 35.

Cancellation of James D. Watson talk
In October 2007, the Science Museum cancelled a talk by the co-discoverer of the structure of DNA, James D. Watson, because he claimed that IQ test results showed black people to have lower intelligence than white people. The decision was criticised by some scientists, including Richard Dawkins, but supported by other scientists, including Steven Rose.

Former galleries 
The museum has undergone many changes in its history with older galleries being replaced by new ones.

The Children's Gallery
1931–1995. Located in the basement, it was replaced by the under fives area called The Garden.

Agriculture
1951–2017. Located on the first floor, it looked at the history and future of farming in the 20th century. It featured model dioramas and object displays. It was replaced by Medicine: The Wellcome Galleries in 2019.

Shipping
1963–2012. Located on the second floor, its contents were 3D scanned and made available online. It was replaced by Information Age.

Land Transport

1967–1996. Located on the ground floor, it displayed vehicles and objects associated with transport on land, including rail and road. It was replaced by the Making the Modern World gallery in 2000.

Glimpses of Medical History
1981–2015. Located on the fourth floor, it contained reconstructions and dioramas of the history of practised medicine. It was not replaced, but subsumed into Medicine: The Wellcome Galleries which opened on the museum's first floor in November 2019.

Science and the Art of Medicine
1981–2015. Located on the fifth floor, which featured exhibits of medical instruments and practices from ancient days and from many countries. It was not replaced, but subsumed into Medicine: The Wellcome Galleries which opened on the museum's first floor in November 2019.

Launchpad
1986–2015. Originally opening on the ground floor, in 1989 it moved to the first floor replacing Textiles. Then in 2000 to the basement of the newly built Wellcome Wing. In 2007, it moved to its final location on the third floor, replacing the George III gallery. It was replaced by Wonderlab in 2016.

Challenge of Materials
1997–2019. Located on the first floor, explored the diversity and properties of materials. It was designed by WilkinsonEyre and featured an exhibit Materials House by Thomas Heatherwick.

Cosmos and Culture
2009–2017. Located on the first floor, it featured astronomical objects showing the study of the night sky. It was replaced by Medicine: The Wellcome Galleries in 2019.

Storage, library and archives 
Blythe House, 1979–2019, the museum's former storage facility in West Kensington, while not a gallery, it offered tours of the collections housed there. Objects formerly housed there are being transferred to the National Collections Centre, at the Science Museum Wroughton, in Wiltshire.

The Science Museum has a dedicated library, and until the 1960s was Britain's National Library for Science, Medicine and Technology. It holds runs of periodicals, early books and manuscripts, and is used by scholars worldwide. It was, for a number of years, run in conjunction with the Central Library of Imperial College, but in 2007 the library was divided over two sites. Histories of science and biographies of scientists were kept at the Imperial College Library until February 2014 when the arrangement was terminated, the shelves were cleared and the books and journals shipped out, joining the rest of the collection, which includes original scientific works and archives at the National Collections Centre.

Dana Research Centre and Library previously an event space and cafe', reopened in its current form in 2015. Open to researchers and members of the public, it allows free access to almost 7,000 volumes, which can be consulted on site.

Sponsorship 
The Science Museum has been sponsored by major organisations including Shell, BP, Samsung and GlaxoSmithKline. Some have been controversial. The museum declined to give details of how much it receives from oil and gas sponsors. Equinor is also the title sponsor of "Wonderlab: The Equinor Gallery", an exhibition for children, while BP is the funding partner of the museum's STEM Training Academy. Equinor's sponsorship of the Wonderlab exhibit was on the basis that the Science Museum would not make any statement to damage the oil firm's reputation.

Shell has influenced how the museum presents climate change in its programme sponsored by the oil company. The museum has signed a gagging clause in its agreement with Shell not to "make any statement or issue any publicity or otherwise be involved in any conduct or matter that may reasonably be foreseen as discrediting or damaging the goodwill or reputation" of Shell.

The museum signed a sponsorship contract with the Norwegian oil and gas company Equinor which contained a gagging clause, stating the museum would not say anything that could damage the fossil fuel company's reputation.

Reactions to sponsorship by fossil fuel companies 
The museum's director, Ian Blatchford, defended the museum's sponsorship policy, saying: "Even if the Science Museum were lavishly publicly funded I would still want to have sponsorship from the oil companies."

Scientists for Global Responsibility called the museum's move "staggeringly out-of-step and irresponsible". Some presenters, including George Monbiot, pulled out of climate talks on finding they were sponsored by BP and the Norwegian oil company Equinor. Bob Ward of the Grantham Research Institute on Climate Change and the Environment said the "carbon capture exhibition is not 'greenwash'".

There have been protests against the sponsorship; in May 2021, a group calling themselves 'Scientists for XR' (Extinction Rebellion) locked themselves to a mechanical tree inside the museum. The UK Student Climate Network carried out an overnight occupation in June 2021, and were threatened with arrest. In August 2021, members of Extinction Rebellion held a protest inside and outside the museum with a  pink dodo.

In 2021 Prof Chris Rapley, a climate scientist, resigned from the museum's advisory board because of oil and gas company sponsorship.

In 2021 more than 40 senior academics and scientists said they would not work with the Science Museum due to its financial relationships with the fossil fuel industry.

In 2022 more than 400 teachers signed an open letter to the museum promising to boycott it following sponsorship of the museum's Energy Revolution exhibition by the coal mining company Adani.

Directors of the Science Museum
The directors of the South Kensington Museum were:
 Henry Cole CB (1857–1873)
 Sir Philip Cunliffe-Owen KCB KCMG CIE (1873–1893)

The directors of the Science Museum have been:
 Major-General Edward R. Festing CB FRS (1893–1904)
 William I. Last (1904–1911)
 Sir Francis Grant Ogilvie CB (1911–1920)
 Colonel Sir Henry Lyons FRS (1920–1933)
 Colonel E. E. B. Mackintosh DSO (1933–1945)
 Herman Shaw (1945–1950)
 F. Sherwood Taylor (1950–1956)
 Sir Terence Morrison-Scott DSc FMA (1956–1960)
 Sir David Follett FMA (1960–1973)
 Dame Margaret Weston DBE FMA (1973–1986)
 Neil Cossons OBE FSA FMA (1986–2000)
 Lindsay Sharp (2000–2002)

The following have been head/director of the Science Museum in London, not including its satellite museums:
 Jon Tucker (2002–2007, Head)
 Chris Rapley CBE (2007–2010)

The following have been directors of the National Museum of Science and Industry, (since April 2012 renamed the Science Museum Group) which oversees the Science Museum and other related museums, from 2002:

 Lindsay Sharp (2002–2005)
 Jon Tucker (2005–06, Acting Director)
 Martin Earwicker FREng (2006–2009)
 Molly Jackson (2009)
 Andrew Scott CBE (2009–10)
 Ian Blatchford (2010–)

References

External links

 
 Albertopolis: Science Museum – architecture and history of the Science Museum
 sciencemuseumgroup.org.uk (SMG) – a group of British museums that includes the Science Museum
 Mapping the World's Science Museums from Nature Publishing Group's team blog

 
Charities based in London

Exempt charities
IMAX venues
Industry museums in England
Musical instrument museums
Medical museums in London
Museums established in 1893
Museums in the Royal Borough of Kensington and Chelsea
Museums with wikis
Science museums in London
Steam museums in London
Transport museums in England
Articles containing video clips
South Kensington
1857 establishments in England
Science Museum Group
Science museums in England